Juan Antonio Espinoza Prieto (26 May 1926 – 14 July 2011) was a Chilean singer and actor.

Also a popular singer, he scored an international 1961 hit with "La novia", mostly known in English-speaking countries as "The Wedding". In 1995 a 20 Greatest Hits CD was released, which included such hits as "La novia" and "El milagro". He also made a very popular Spanish version of a song from the Italian singer Domenico Modugno.

Prieto also sang a popular ballad, "Juan Bobo", in homage to the popular Juan Bobo of Puerto Rican folklore.

Partial filmography
 Juan Mondiola (1950)
 The Two Little Rascals (1961)
 La novia (1961)
 La boda (1964)
 El tímido (1965)
 La industria del matrimonio (1965) - (segment "Romántico")
 De profesión, sospechosos (1966) - Joaquin Frias
 Eroe vagabondo'' (1966)

See also
 Nino Bravo
 Lucho Gatica

References

External links

1926 births
2011 deaths
People from Iquique
20th-century Chilean male singers
Chilean male film actors
20th-century Chilean male actors
20th-century Chilean male artists